Lake Rosseau/Onnalinda Point Water Aerodrome  is located  north northwest  of Port Carling, Ontario, Canada.

See also
 List of airports in the Port Carling area

References

Registered aerodromes in Ontario
Seaplane bases in Ontario
Transport in the District Municipality of Muskoka